The following is a list of notable deaths in February 2009.

Entries for each day are listed alphabetically by surname. A typical entry lists information in the following sequence:
 Name, age, country of citizenship at birth, subsequent country of citizenship (if applicable), reason for notability, cause of death (if known), and reference.

February 2009

1 
Charles W. Akers, 88, American historian.
Joe Ades, 74, American salesman.
Anna Donald, 42, Australian epidemiologist, breast cancer.
Lukas Foss, 86, American composer, conductor, pianist and educator, heart attack.
Tim Grundy, 50, British radio and television presenter, heart attack.
Michael Homer, 50, American business executive (Netscape), Creutzfeldt–Jakob disease.
Ranbir Singh Hooda, 94, Indian politician, after long illness.
Peter Howson, 89, Australian politician, Minister for Air (1964–1968) and Environment, Aborigines and the Arts (1971–1972), fall.
Arieh Levavi, 96, Lithuanian-born Israeli public servant, ambassador to Argentina during capture of Adolf Eichmann. (Hebrew)
Yoya Martínez, 96, Chilean actress, natural causes. (Spanish)
Jim McWithey, 81, American race car driver.
Roy Magee, 79, Northern Irish peace activist.
*Sir Alan Muir Wood, 87, British civil engineer.
Edward Joseph O'Donnell, 77, American Roman Catholic prelate, Bishop of Lafayette (1994–2002).
John Roy Whinnery, 92, American electrical engineer and educator.

2 
Donald Alexander, 87, American government official, Commissioner of the Internal Revenue Service (1973–1977), cancer.
Paul Birch, 46, English footballer (Aston Villa, Wolves), bone cancer.
Ralph Carpenter, 99, American antique and architecture preservationist, natural causes.
Alan Davies, 75, English rugby league player, (Oldham, Wigan, Great Britain).
Lublin Dilja, 51, Albanian ambassador.
Yusril Djalinus, 64, Indonesian journalist, co-founder of Tempo Magazine, stroke.
Russ Germain, 62, Canadian radio presenter, lung cancer.
Paul Galloway, 74, American journalist (Chicago Sun-Times, Chicago Tribune), heart attack.
Susan Hibbert, 84, British secretary, last surviving British witness to signing of the World War II German Instrument of Surrender.
Howard Kanovitz, 79, American painter, bacterial infection after heart surgery.
Ralph Kaplowitz, 89, American basketball player (New York Knicks), kidney failure.
Fredrik Kayser, 90, Norwegian resistance fighter during World War II, after long illness. 
John A. Knight, 77, American church leader, General Superintendent of the Church of the Nazarene (1985–2001).
James E. Long, 68, American politician, North Carolina Commissioner of Insurance (1985–2009), complications of a stroke.
Jean Martin, 86, French actor (The Battle of Algiers, The Day of the Jackal), cancer. 
Ezzat Negahban, 82, Iranian archaeologist. (Persian)
Louis Proost, 73, Belgian racing cyclist.
Joe M. Rodgers, 75, American construction executive, Ambassador to France (1985–1989), cancer.
Sunny Skylar, 95, American songwriter.
Ralf Veidemann, 96, Estonian footballer.
Jim Wilson, 67, American football player (San Francisco 49ers) and wrestler, cancer.
Kazuhiro Yamauchi, 76, Japanese baseball player, liver failure.

3 
Ben Blank, 87, American television graphics innovator (CBS, ABC), complications from a stroke.
Tom Brumley, 73, American steel guitarist (The Buckaroos), heart attack.
Rabindra Kumar Das Gupta, 93, Indian scholar of Bengali and English literature.
Kurt Demmler, 65, German songwriter, suicide by hanging.
Sid Finney, 79, British ice hockey player.
Millard Fuller, 74, American co-founder of Habitat for Humanity International, after short illness.
Henry Hsu, 96, Chinese-born Taiwanese athlete and politician, MLY (1973–1987), heart failure.
Warren Kimbro, 74, American Black Panther member, convicted murderer and charitable organization executive, heart attack.
Mike Maloy, 59, American-born Austrian basketball player, influenza.
Max Neuhaus, 69, American musician, cancer.
António dos Reis Rodrigues, 90, Portuguese Roman Catholic prelate Bishop of Madarsuma (1966–1998).
Jorge Serguera, 76, Cuban journalist, President of the Cuban Institute of Radio and Television (death announced on this date).
Sheng-yen, 79, Chinese-born Taiwanese Buddhist Zen master, kidney disease.
Pavlo Zahrebelnyi, 84, Ukrainian writer, after long illness.

4 
Antonie Dixon, 40, New Zealand murderer, suicide.
Christophe Dupouey, 40, French cyclist, World Cross Country Champion (1996), suicide.
Arnljot Eggen, 85, Norwegian writer. 
Ramón Hernández, 68, Puerto Rican baseball player. (Spanish)
Lux Interior, 62, American singer, songwriter and musician (The Cramps), aortic dissection.
Ed Schwartz, 62, American radio personality, kidney and heart disease.
Mark Shepherd, 86, American chairman of Texas Instruments (1976–1988), complications from pulmonary fibrosis.
David Snow, 84, British ornithologist.

5 
Sigurd Andersson, 82, Swedish Olympic bronze medal-winning (1952) cross-country skier. 
Albert Barillé, 88, French television screenwriter and producer.
John W. Grace, 82, Canadian Privacy Commissioner (1983–1990), heart attack.
Khalid Hasan, 74, Pakistani journalist and author, cancer.
George Hughes, 83, American football player (Pittsburgh Steelers).
Payton Jordan, 91, American coach of 1968 United States Olympic track and field team, cancer.
Leo Orenstein, 89, Canadian director, producer and writer.
Raaphi Persitz, 74, Israeli chess master.
Dana Vávrová, 41, Czech-German actress and film director, cervical cancer. (German)
Noah Weinberg, 78, American-born Israeli rabbi, founder of Aish HaTorah.
Xiangzhong Yang, 49, Chinese-born American stem cell scientist, cancer.

6 
Bashir Ahmad, 68, Indian-born Scottish politician, MSP for Glasgow region, heart attack.
Philip Carey, 83, American actor (One Life to Live), lung cancer.
Alfred Flores, 92, Guamanian rancher and politician, member of the Legislature of Guam.
George Karpati, 74, Canadian neurologist.
Shirley Jean Rickert, 82, American actress (Our Gang), after long illness.
Susan Walsh, 60, American actress, natural causes.
James Whitmore, 87, American actor (Oklahoma!. Planet of the Apes, The Shawshank Redemption), lung cancer.

7 
Molly Bee, 69, American country singer ("I Saw Mommy Kissing Santa Claus"), complications from a stroke.
Jack Cover, 88, American scientist, inventor of the Taser, pneumonia.
Blossom Dearie, 82, American jazz singer and pianist (Schoolhouse Rock!), after long illness.
Reg Evans, 80, Australian actor, bushfire.
John Gabler, 78, American baseball pitcher (New York Yankees, Washington Senators).
Sir George Godber, 100, British physician and public servant, Chief Medical Officer (1960–1973).
Richard Gordon, 61, British author, heart attack. (Chinese)
Joe Haverty, 72, Irish footballer (Arsenal, Blackburn Rovers, Millwall, Republic of Ireland).
Betty Jameson, 89, American golfer, three-time major championship winner.
Jacques Lancelot, 88, French clarinetist, heart failure. 
Mel Kaufman, 50, American football player (Washington Redskins).
Brian Naylor, 78, Australian news presenter, bushfire.
Jorge Reyes, 56, Mexican musician (Chac Mool), heart attack. (Spanish)
Piotr Stańczak, 42, Polish geologist, beheaded.
Richard Zann, 64, Australian ornithologist, bushfire.

8 
Marian Cozma, 26, Romanian handball player, stabbed.
William Alexander Deer, 98, British geologist, Vice-Chancellor of the University of Cambridge (1971–1973).
Sigurdur Helgason, 87, Icelandic business executive, CEO of Icelandair and pioneer of low cost airlines.
Wesley L. McDonald, 84, American admiral and naval aviator.
Neil McNeill, 87, Australian politician, member of the House of Representatives (1961–1963).
Giorgio Melchiori, 88, Italian literary critic.
Francis Dennis Ramsay, 83, Scottish painter.
Terry Spencer, 90, British RAF fighter pilot and war photographer, cancer.
Bob Stephen, 50, Canadian football player, heart attack.

9 
Robert Anderson, 91, American Academy Award–nominated playwright and screenwriter, pneumonia.
Monica Therese Angeles, 18, YFC High school-based HPV and UP Diliman IE student.
Kazys Bradūnas, 91, Lithuanian émigré poet and editor. 
Marc Burrows, 30, British footballer, cancer.
Gareth Alban Davies, 82, British academic and poet.
Reg Davies, 79, Welsh footballer (Newcastle United, Swansea Town, Wales).
Eluana Englaro, 38, Italian patient in right to die case, withdrawal of nutrition.
Neville Hamilton, 48, British footballer.
Vic Lewis, 89, British jazz guitarist.
Orlando "Cachaíto" López, 76, Cuban bassist (Buena Vista Social Club), complications from prostate surgery.
Don Maclennan, 79, South African poet and playwright.
Maria Orwid, 78, Polish psychiatrist.
Peer Portner, 69, Kenyan-born British developer of ventricular assist device, cancer.
Sean F. Scott, 39, American amyotrophic lateral sclerosis activist, amyotrophic lateral sclerosis.

10 
Jan Błoński, 78, Polish literary critic, Holocaust scholar.
Carolyn George, 81, American dancer and photographer, primary lateral sclerosis.
Leila Hadley, 83, American travel writer.
Philippe Kourouma, 76, Guinean Roman Catholic prelate, Bishop of N’Zérékoré.
Berting Labra, 75, Filipino character actor, emphysema.
Jeremy Lusk, 24, American motocross racer, brain injury.
Jean-Baptiste Mintsa-Mi-Mba, 60, Gabonese politician. (French)
Nate Schenker, 91, American football player.

11 
Estelle Bennett, 67, American singer (The Ronettes), colon cancer.
Fred Graves, 84, Canadian Olympic rower.
Virgil Lee Griffin, 64, American Ku Klux Klan leader.
Willem Johan Kolff, 97, Dutch-born American physician, inventor of the artificial kidney.
Sir Peter Leng, 83, British Army general.
Penny Ramsey, 61, Australian actress, cancer.
Rail Rzayev, 64, Azerbaijani general, head of the Air Force, shot.
Marina Svetlova, 86, French-born American ballerina and teacher, complications from stroke.
Mildred Wolfe, 96, American artist, after long illness.
Shyamala Gopalan, 70, Tamil-born American biomedical scientist, colon cancer.

12 
Hermann Becht, 69, German opera singer. 
Vasanti N. Bhat-Nayak, 70, Indian professor of combinatorics and graph theory. 
Giacomo Bulgarelli, 68, Italian footballer, after long illness.
Evan Ira Farber, 87, American Faculty Emeritus (Earlham College).
Ed Grothus, 85, American anti-nuclear activist, cancer.
Lis Hartel, 87, Danish equestrian.
Hugh Leonard, 82, Irish playwright, multiple ailments.
Mat Mathews, 84, Dutch jazz accordionist. 
Domenica Niehoff, 63, German prostitution activist, complications from lung disease.
Malcolm Toon, 92, American ambassador (Czechoslovakia 1969–71, Yugoslavia 1971–75, Israel 1975–76, USSR 1976–79).
Ted Uhlaender, 68, American baseball player (Twins, Indians, Reds), heart attack.
Aasiya Zubair, 37, American businesswoman, co-founder of Bridges TV, beheaded.
Notable Americans killed in the crash of Colgan Air Flight 3407:
Alison Des Forges, 66, human rights activist.
Beverly Eckert, 57, activist, member of the 9/11 Family Steering Committee.
Coleman Mellett, 34, jazz guitarist.
Gerry Niewood, 65, jazz saxophonist.

13 
Gianna Maria Canale, 81, Italian actress. 
Joe Goldstein, 81, American sports promoter, heart attack and stroke.
Geshe Gyeltsen, 85, Tibetan spiritual leader, founder of Thubten Dhargye Ling.
Alfred J. Kahn, 90, American child welfare expert.
Jean Laroyenne, 78, French Olympic bronze medal-winning (1952) fencer.
Dilys Laye, 74, British actress, cancer.
Julius Patching, 92, Australian Olympic official.
Corky Trinidad, 69, Filipino-born American cartoonist, pancreatic cancer.
Edward Upward, 105, British writer, chest infection.
Bakhtiyar Vahabzadeh, 83, Azerbaijani poet, after long illness.

14 
Sir Bernard Ashley, 82, British businessman, cancer.
Louie Bellson, 84, American jazz drummer, complications from Parkinson's disease.
Geoffrey Collin, 87, British army general.
Luís Andrés Edo, 82, Spanish anarchist.
Kjersti Graver, 63, Norwegian public servant, Consumer Ombudsman (1987–1995). 
Buck Griffin, 85, American rockabilly musician, heart failure.
Alfred A. Knopf, Jr., 90, American publisher, son of Alfred A. Knopf, complications from fall.
John McGlinn, 55, American conductor and historian of musicals.
Boris Yavitz, 85, Georgian-born American academic, dean of Columbia Business School (1975–1982), prostate cancer.

15 
Joe Cuba, 78, American musician, complications of a bacterial infection.
Noble Doss, 88, American football player.
Diether Haenicke, 73, American academic, Western Michigan University President (1985–1998, 2006–2007), head injury.
William R. Sharpe, Jr., 80, American politician, West Virginia Senate (1960–1980, 1984–2009), President pro tem (1990–2009).
Carl Venne, 62, American chairman of the Crow Nation since 2002, natural causes.

16 
Pyotr Abrassimov, 96, Belarusian partisan.
Dorothy Bridges, 93, American actress and poet, wife of Lloyd Bridges, mother of Beau and Jeff Bridges, age-related causes.
Konrad Dannenberg, 96, German-born American rocket scientist, natural causes.
Sir Ernest Harrison, 82, British businessman.
*Stephen Kim Sou-hwan, 86, South Korean Roman Catholic prelate, Archbishop of Seoul (1968–1998).
Edward Salia, 56, Ghanaian politician, Minister of State (1995), throat infection.
Travis, 13, American-born chimpanzee, television commercial animal, shot.

17 
Doris Abrahams, 88, American theatrical producer (Equus), heart failure.
Eric Blau, 87, American theatrical producer (Jacques Brel is Alive and Well and Living in Paris), pneumonia.
Conchita Cintrón, 86, Chilean-born Portuguese bullfighter, heart attack. (Portuguese)
Edhi Handoko, 48, Indonesian chess grandmaster, heart attack.
Victor Kiernan, 95, British historian.
Gazanfer Özcan, 78, Turkish actor, heart failure.
Robert Robideau, 61, American Native Americans activist.
Shabnam Romani, 80, Pakistani poet and writer, after long illness.
Gyula Sáringer, 81, Hungarian agronomist. 
Brad Van Pelt, 57, American football player (New York Giants), heart attack.
Mike Whitmarsh, 46, American beach volleyball and basketball player, suicide by carbon monoxide poisoning.

18 
Jacques Bino, 50, French Guadeloupean trade union official, shot.
Viking Björk, 90, Swedish surgeon.
J. Max Bond, Jr., 73, American architect, cancer.
Chet Bulger, 91, American football player (Chicago Cardinals), natural causes.
Snooks Eaglin, 73, American guitarist, heart attack.
Raymond Alvah Hanson, 85, American inventor.
John Kanzius, 64, American inventor, pneumonia.
Robert Luff, 94, British theatre producer and impresario.
Luigi Nobile, 87, Italian footballer. 
Tayeb Salih, 80, Sudanese writer (Season of Migration to the North).
Kamila Skolimowska, 26, Polish hammer thrower, 2000 Olympics gold medalist, pulmonary embolism.
Miika Tenkula, 34, Finnish guitarist and songwriter (Sentenced).
*Andrew Tsien Chih-ch'un, 83, Taiwanese Roman Catholic prelate, Bishop of Hwalien (1992–2001), heart attack.

19 
Jerry Anderson, 76, Puerto Rican diver.
Frank Carlton, 72, English rugby league player.
Ronald Dearing, Baron Dearing, 78, British life peer and civil servant, cancer.
Kelly Groucutt, 63, British bass guitar player (Electric Light Orchestra), heart attack.
Edmund Hlawka, 92, Austrian mathematician. (German)
Ibrahim Hussein, 72, Malaysian artist, heart attack.
Ian Jenkins, 64, British public official, Surgeon General (2002–2006), Constable and Governor of Windsor Castle (2008–2009).
Oreste Lionello, 81, Italian actor and voice actor.
Nonnie Moore, 87, American fashion editor (GQ, Harper's Bazaar), choking accident.
Raymond Mulinghausen, 88, French Olympic diver.
Keith W. Nolan, 44, American military historian.
Harrison Ridley Jr., 70, American jazz presenter, after short illness.
Anna Watt, 85, British entertainer (Fran and Anna), natural causes.
Thomas Welsh, 87, American Roman Catholic prelate, Bishop of Allentown (1983–1997).
James White, 86, British politician, MP for Glasgow Pollok (1970–1987).

20 
Marcella Althaus-Reid, 56, Argentine-born British Queer theologian, professor of contextual theology (University of Edinburgh).
Friedrich Berentzen, 81, German industrialist. 
James I. C. Boyd, 87, British railway historian.
Fine Cotton, 31, Australian thoroughbred racehorse involved in sports betting substitution scandal.
Antonio De Rosso, 68, Italian religious leader, founder of the Orthodox Church in Italy.
Mary Jacobus, 52, American journalist, cerebral hemorrhage.
William Jorden, 85, American journalist and diplomat, lung cancer.
Larry H. Miller, 64, American businessman, owner of the Utah Jazz, complications of diabetes.
Christopher Nolan, 43, Irish author, winner of the Whitbread Prize (1988), pulmonary aspiration.
Július Nôta, 37, Slovak footballer and coach, stabbed. 
Robert Quarry, 83, American film and television actor.
Fats Sadi, 81, Belgian jazz musician, vocalist and composer.
Socks, 19, American Presidential cat of the Clinton family, euthanized.
Shraga Weil, 90, Israeli painter. (Hebrew)

21 
Ian Alger, 82, American psychiatrist, heart failure.
François De Pauw, 82, Belgian Olympic basketball player.
Fannie Kauffman, 84, Canadian-born Mexican actress and comedian, natural causes.
Ilya Piatetski-Shapiro, 79, Russian-born Israeli mathematician, Parkinson's disease.
Mary Printz, 85, American switchboard operator, inspiration for Bells Are Ringing.
Wilton G. S. Sankawulo, 71, Liberian politician and academic, Chairman of the Council of State (1995–1996), heart failure.
Victor Zarnowitz, 89, Polish-born American economist, heart attack.

22 
Candido Cannavò, 78, Italian sports journalist, editor-in-chief of La Gazzetta dello Sport (1983–2002), cerebral hemorrhage.
Barbara Marshall, 64, American journalist and politician, member of the Honolulu City Council since 2002, colon cancer.
Rhena Schweitzer Miller, 90, American humanitarian, daughter of Albert Schweitzer.
Derrell Palmer, 86, American football player (Cleveland Browns), natural causes.
Paul Joseph Pham Dinh Tung, 89, Vietnamese Roman Catholic prelate and cardinal, archbishop of Hanoi (1994–2005).
Sławomir Rutka, 33, Polish football player, suicide. (Spanish).
Safi Taha, 85, Lebanese Olympic wrestler.
Howard Zieff, 81, American film director (Private Benjamin), complications from Parkinson's disease.

23 
Marie Boas Hall, 89, American historian.
Tom Cole, 75, American screenwriter and playwright, multiple myeloma.
Sverre Fehn, 84, Norwegian architect.
Lorna Frampton, 88, British Olympic swimmer.
Frank Gallacher, 65, Scottish-born Australian actor.
Elizabeth Bradford Holbrook, 96, Canadian portrait sculptor.
August Kiuru, 86, Finnish Olympic silver medal-winning (1948, 1956) cross-country skier.
Seppo Kolehmainen, 76, Finnish actor, after long illness.
James Leslie, 50, British politician, member of the Northern Ireland Assembly for North Antrim (1998–2003), heart attack.
Noel Martin, 86, American graphic designer, leukemia.
Laurence Payne, 89, British actor (Sexton Blake).
Tuulikki Pietilä, 92, Finnish graphic artist.
Franciszek Starowieyski, 78, Polish artist.
Jean Studer, 94, Swiss Olympic athlete.
Scott Symons, 75, Canadian writer.
David Taylor, 79, American banker.

24 
Jean Battersby, 80, Australian arts executive, esophageal cancer.
Svatopluk Havelka, 83, Czech composer. 
Edward Judd, 76, British actor (The Day the Earth Caught Fire).
Antoinette K-Doe, 66, American bar owner, heart attack.
Pearl Lang, 87, American dancer and choreographer, heart attack.
James D. McGinnis, 77, American politician, Lieutenant Governor of Delaware (1977–1981), cancer.

25 
Randall Bewley, 53, American guitarist (Pylon), heart attack.
Ian Carr, 75, British writer and musician (Nucleus), after long illness.
Philip José Farmer, 91, American writer (Riverworld).
Bill Holm, 65, American author and poet, heart attack.
Molly Kool, 93, Canadian sailor, North America's first licensed female sea captain.
Roger C. Kormendi, 59, American economist, Creutzfeldt–Jakob disease.
Howard Menger, 87, American ufologist.
Eisha Stephen Atieno Odhiambo, 63, Kenyan academic, dementia.
Clarence Swensen, 91, American actor (munchkin in The Wizard of Oz), complications of a stroke.
Max Théret, 96, French businessman, founder of the Fnac electronics retailer.

26 
Rick Beckett, 54, American radio broadcaster (WOOD (AM)), heart attack.
William H. Behle, 99, American ornithologist.
Ruth Drexel, 78, German actress (Der Bulle von Tölz). 
Johnny Kerr, 76, American basketball player, coach, and color commentator (Chicago Bulls), prostate cancer.
Morley Street, 25, British racehorse.
Sir Michael Quinlan, 78, British civil servant, Permanent Secretary at the Ministry of Defence (1988–1992).
Wendy Richard, 65, British actress (Are You Being Served?, EastEnders), breast cancer.
Nell Soto, 82, American politician, member of the California State Senate (2000–2006), complications from stroke.
Ruth Spalding, 95, British actor, director and writer.
Wilbert Tatum, 76, American publisher (New York Amsterdam News), multiple organ failure.
Norm Van Lier, 61, American basketball player (Chicago Bulls).

27 
Rosalie Silber Abrams, 92, American politician.
John Alvin, 91, American actor, complications of a fall.
Alan Landers, 68, American smoking model turned opponent, throat and lung cancer.
Robert E. A. Lee, 87, American documentary film producer, cancer.
James Page Mackey, 95, Canadian chief of Toronto Police Service (1958–1970).
Manea Mănescu, 92, Romanian Prime Minister (1974–1979). 
Alastair McCorquodale, 83, British athlete and cricketer, silver medallist at the 1948 Summer Olympics.
John Francis Marchment Middleton, 87, British anthropologist.
Gerriet Postma, 76, Dutch painter. 
Dorothea Holt Redmond, 98, American movie artist and illustrator.
Geoffrey Smith, 80, British gardening expert and presenter.

28 
Tomás Altamirano Mantovani, 49, Panamanian politician, National Assembly deputy, traffic accident.
Mark H. Beers, 54, American geriatrician, complications from diabetes.
Ode Burrell, 69, American football player (Houston Oilers), complications from diabetes.
Paul Harvey, 90, American radio broadcaster.
Johnny Holiday, 96, American actor.
Alvin Klein, 73, American theater critic, heart attack.
Al Lewis, 84, American children's television host, natural causes.
Manila, 26, American Thoroughbred racehorse, aortic ring rupture.
Miguel Serrano, 91, Chilean poet, diplomat and neo-Nazi, stroke. (Spanish)
Tom Sturdivant, 78, American baseball player (New York Yankees).

References

2009-02
 02